Under the Dunham classification (Dunham, 1962) system of limestones, a grainstone is defined as a grain-supported carbonate rock that contains less than 1% mud-grade material. This definition has recently been clarified as a carbonate-dominated rock that does not contain any carbonate mud and where less than 10% of the components are larger than 2 mm. The spaces between grains may be empty (pores) or filled by cement.

The identification of grainstone 
The presence of any primary carbonate mud precludes a classification of grainstone. A study of the use of carbonate classification systems by Lokier and Al Junaibi (2016) highlighted that the most common source of confusion in the classification of grainstone was to misidentify fine-grained internal micrite, generated by in-situ processes, as clay–silt grade sediment - thus resulting in the misidentification of grainstone as packstone. Failure to correctly determine the size and abundance of component grains >2 mm was also a source of error.

Dunham's original definition of grainstone stated that it must contain less than 1% mud to fine-silt grade (<20 μm) sediment. Embry & Klovan (1971) and Wright (1992) reduced the permitted amount of carbonate mud in a grainstone to zero. Given that grainstone facies are interpreted to have been deposited under high-energy conditions, it is sensible to preclude the presence of primary carbonate mud from this classification.

References

Limestone